Sir John Tudor Walters PC (25 February 1866 – 16 July 1933) was a Welsh architect,  surveyor and Liberal Party politician. He served as Paymaster-General under David Lloyd George from 1919 to 1922 and once again briefly in 1931 under Ramsay MacDonald.

Political career
Walters was elected as the Member of Parliament (MP) for Sheffield Brightside at the 1906 general election and was knighted in 1912.

He served as Paymaster-General in the Government of David Lloyd George from 1919 to 1922 and was sworn of the Privy Council in 1919. He lost his seat at Sheffield at the 1922 general election.

He tried unsuccessfully to get back into the House of Commons in 1923 at Pudsey and Otley in the West Riding of Yorkshire. He again stood for election to Parliament at the 1929 general election as Liberal candidate for the Cornish seat of Penryn and Falmouth. The seat was a marginal which had been won by the Liberals in 1923, but gained by the Conservatives in 1924, although the incumbent Conservative MP did not seek re-election. Ultimately Walters gained the seat from the Conservatives with a majority of 1,138 votes, with the Labour candidate finishing a relatively close third. He was once again briefly Paymaster-General from September to November 1931 under Ramsay MacDonald. He stood down from parliament at the 1931 general election.

Housing policy

He is best known for the Tudor Walters Report that appeared just as the World War was ending in November 1918 and influence British housing policy for a century. Walters was inspired by the garden city movement, calling for spacious low-density developments and semi-detached houses built to a high construction standard.  Older women could now vote so local politicians started listening to them, and in response put more emphasis on such amenities as communal laundromats, extra bedrooms, indoor lavatories, running hot water, separate parlours to demonstrate respectability, and practical vegetable gardens rather than manicured yards.

Housewives had had their fill of chamber pots. His Report influenced the Housing and Town Planning Act of 1919. With it Prime Minister David Lloyd George set up a system of government housing that followed his 1918 campaign promises of "homes fit for heroes".

Called the "Addison Act", it required local authorities to survey their housing needs, and start building houses to replace slums. The treasury subsidized the low rents. Slum clearance now moved from being a public health issue, to a matter of town planning.

References

External links
 

 
 

|-
 
 

1866 births
1933 deaths
Knights Bachelor
Liberal Party (UK) MPs for English constituencies
UK MPs 1906–1910
UK MPs 1910
UK MPs 1910–1918
UK MPs 1918–1922
Members of the Parliament of the United Kingdom for Penryn and Falmouth
Members of the Privy Council of the United Kingdom
National Liberal Party (UK, 1922) politicians